Max Steel is a line of action figures produced and owned by the toy company Mattel since 1999. The original figures based on the first TV series were similar to the original 12-inch G.I. Joe toys, consisting almost entirely of different versions of Max Steel, the main character, and one or two of his enemies, a couple of vehicles and two or three special packages. The original toy series ran from 1999–2013. At the end of that period, was substituted by a different series of toys with the same brand name, but with a change in quality and design intended to tie into the companion TV series in 2013. The 2013 line did not exhibit 1/6 scale of the original and reduced the number of articulations and action features of the figures.

Max Steel was simultaneously developed into an animated series of the same name, which originally aired from February 25, 2000, to January 15, 2002, followed by nine direct-to-video animated films, being released annually from 2004 to 2012. A reboot aired on Disney XD in the United States, where it had premiered on April 1, 2013.

Original toy series 1999–2013
In 1998, Netter Digital was commissioned by Mattel to create and develop a secret agent themed TV series partially based on James Bond's adventures, but aimed to young kids. The series premiered in 2000, but since October 1999, the first toys based on the series hit the shelves. The Max Steel toy line quickly become an instant success, although most of the first toys were completely different from the characters on the series. This may be due to the fact that both, series and toys, were developed simultaneously, but in independent way. Most early Max Steel toys had a notorious military, adventure or sport clothes not related to the series in any way, but surprisingly quite similar to the 70's Mattel's action figure Big Jim. It was also noted that in Latin American market, many Big Jim toys were sold at that time under the name "Kid Acero", which literally translates as "Kid Steel", a different Mattel toy line who also had a similar plot as Max Steel's TV series. Eventually, Mattel cleared those apparent coincidences in a TV episode in which it is revealed that Max Steel is indeed Big Jim's son, and other secondary character named "Jefferson Smith" is actually "Big Jeff" from the same classical  Big Jim toy line, just 20 year older, hence making a connection between both toy lines, thus making this one of the first times a toy company makes a continuation of generations of toys, taking in consideration their history, backgrounds and timeline.

After the first year, development of the series went to Foundation Imaging, an animation company which eventually declared a bankruptcy at the end of second series. Mattel then choose Rainmaker Entertainment as the main animation studio, which at the time also was in charge of Transformers: Beast Wars.  Following the same formula as Beast Wars, once Mainframe took control of the production, every new toy makes an appearance in the series or the movies, so they finally made a match. After the Endangered Species movie, every new set of toys includes at least a couple of wild animals as companions of Max too.  The original run of the original toy series began in 1999 and ended in late 2013, with the reboot of the TV series. Since the toy line was intended solely for male kids, despite of the constant presence of empowered women in the series as main or supporting characters, no female figures were ever produced.

Max Steel Series 1
All the initial run of Max Steel action figures were quite different from the TV character, due to the fact the character was in development at the time. Most Max Steel vehicles of this series used to be blue, with yellow or green accents, as the early 80's Big Jim sport and spy series. This particular combination of colors was widely used on all Max Steel toys for waves 1 and 2, despite the fact the main characters in the series wears blue and brown uniforms. It was only until wave 3 when the first Max Steel action figure to be identical as the TV character "Going Turbo!" was released, a year after the initial debut of Max Steel, but in the new Urban Siege sub line instead of the main toy line. Additional to the multiple Max toy versions, only one villain named Psycho was released as the main antagonist, although in the TV series Max had over a dozen different recurrent enemies. Waves 1 and 2 included exactly the same Psycho action figure, with only minor changes in the box. Wave 3 changed Psycho's mechanic arm, for a new spring loaded one, while the rest of the body remained mostly the same. Several large size vehicles, including a jet, a boat and a couple of sport cars were released as part of this initial series.

Series 2: Themed series
At the end of 2000, Mattel took the decision to divide the Max Steel figures into different sub lines. All sport related toys, for example, would go to "Extreme Sports Adventure," while others would go into "Urban Siege," "Snake Island," etc. Vitriol, a new villain, was produced as the main villain in the sub line Urban Siege, using the same molds used to produce Psycho. Vitriol and Psycho wear the same pants, albeit different colors. The only notorious difference is, while Psycho's right arm is a bionic construction which can be transformed into a claw/laser, Vitriol's arms were green, with light up features. By coincidence, after the September 11, 2001 attacks, all Urban Siege action figures were immediately recalled because they contained "Secret Mission" Cards. Each card contained clues and plots about fictional terrorists attacks on American soil. Children were supposed to use the cards to be "informed of their next mission and stop the terrorists" before they could demolish a building, spread a deadly virus or detonate a nuke bomb, among other tasks. Vitriol and least a couple of cards included the text:  "Vitriol is on top of the World Trade Center ready to blast the city with his deadly energy waves! Your Mission: Stop Vitriol before he destroys New York City!". Once any mention of terrorism in New York was eliminated, the toys returned to the shelves, but as part of the main line this time. The Urban Siege series which focused on counter terrorism ended immediately after the recall. Other figures of different lines retained their respective mission cards. Rumors say the real reason of this act of empathy were the low popularity and poor sales of Vitriol, specially because it is the only Max Steel action figure never produced again after its initial release.

Endangered Species
 In 2004, Mattel took the decision to cancel the TV show and create a series of direct to DVD movies instead, to be released in an annual schedule, starting with Endangered Species. This also marked a completely new direction of the toy line. Since then, every new set of Max Steel toys makes an appearance in their respective movie, a formula also used on Barbie, Monster High and other Mattel products. As a result of this decision, several iconic characters and vehicles which were not included on that specific movie were removed from the toyline. The N-Tek minijet and the Sport Coupe which were Max's primary ways of transportation in the TV series didn't make the cut into the movies, so the respective toys were discontinued before the movie's premiere. Many other elements from the series were also removed from the toys, including any mention of Max' secret identity, "Josh McGrath". Although no toys based on Josh were ever released, he was often mentioned in the toy's packages.

World of elements Series
 In the 2005 movie "Forces of Nature"  a new villain is introduced in the toy line, an artificial creature named Elementor, who has the ability to emulates 5 different elements (water, fire, air, earth and metal). This allowed Mattel to create several different versions of the same character, as opposite to the previous toy series in which usually only one or two villain figures were produced. At some point, Mattel released 10 different Elementor variations, 2 for each element at the same time. For the second wave, all Max figures were reassigned to a specific "World of...", with arms, equipment and accessories designed to challenge each specific Elementor's version. Thus, in the "World of Water", Max is dressed as a diver or surfer, uses a surf board, a boat and battles Water Elementor only. In "World of Air", he has a parachute, a jet pack, and battles Air Elementor, and so on... The World of elements toy series lasted for 3 years, with a total of 6 waves.

Adrenalink Series
 In 2007 Mattel dropped the Going Turbo! concept which was present from the beginning of the series as Max's battlecry (and was also used to transform into his superhuman form), for the Adrenalink one. The most notorious change in the toy packages it is that the Max Steel logo was changed from yellow to green. The Adrenalink subline includes almost all sport and adventure versions of Max not related to Elementor.

Max Gear
 In mid 2007, Mattel released for the first time "Max gear" to be dressed by kids. The toys included a retractile Ninja Sword, Max's communicator, Max's suit with battle sounds and light, night vision glasses, binoculars and other stuff alike.

Extroyed Series
 This line introduces a new villain in the toy series. The release of the first Extroyer action figure was announced as a special event, released only a couple of weeks before the movie Dark Rival premiered on Cartoon Network Philippines in late 2007. The original package contained both Max and Extroyer action figures, but Extroyer's face and body were mostly covered with the package's artwork, so no one could tell for sure how he looked like. Some time later the same Extroyer was available as a stand-alone figure, this time uncovered. All action figures related to Dark Rival movie and this new villain are often denoted by the word "Extroyed" in front of the package, with new purple or dark logos. The last wave of the Extroyed series also included a Max crime partner for the very first time. Although in all media Max was supported by a large cast of allies, only an android named Cytro, made it to the action figures. Mattel made it a special event, and reused the same mystery double pack used for Extroyer's initial release. Starting from this point, several additional figures of Cytro were also released along the years until the end of the original run of Max Steel.

Turbo Missions
 Released for the first time in 2009, these three different series separated the main toy line into numbered themed missions, in a similar way as the Urban Siege line intended to separate the military-themed figures from the sport ones in 2000. The "Animal Encounter" subset grouped all animal and wildlife related toys with Extroyer as the main villain, while the "High Voltage" subset was mostly focused in water and lightning versions of Elementor. A third subset named "N-Tek Invasion" simply grouped all other items which do not belong to the previous two. The Turbo Missions packages also had large set numbers (1, 2, 3) in reference to their respective mission. In 2010 a second wave of Turbo Missions action figures was released, but this time the themes were "Bio-Threat", "Cyber -Attack" and "Night Strike". Similarly as the previous ones, Bio-Threat grouped all earth pollution related adventures, while Night Strike showcased glow in the dark action figures. Cyber attack was mostly the same as N-tek Invasion, grouping all other enemies focused on causing mayhem inside N-Tek's headquarters.

Battle for the Earth series
 In 2009, Mattel also released an Earth's protection and conservation themed series of toys, whose main villain was a pollution based monster formerly named ToxZon. This included toys with spring water and ooze dropping features, plus a few light and sound toys. This toys mentioned in the packages phrases dedicated to recycling, sustainability and green solutions for the planet. Although focused on ToxZon, later waves of this toys also included new and last versions of Cytro, Extroyer and Elementor, and ended with the final release of a new villain named Makino in late 2012. This was also the end of the original run of Max Steel's Toys.

Reboot toy series 2013

In 2013 Mattel finished its relationship with Mainframe, and decided to reboot the TV series after 13 years. As part of this decision, Playground Productions, Nerd Corps Entertainment and FremantleMedia Kids & Entertainment created a completely different origin story, and Mattel produced new toys based on the new designs, notoriously different from the original ones. The most notable change was the drop of toy's clothes and wearable accessories. While the original action figures came with fabric made vest and pants and detachable or snap-on accessories, -thus allowing to undress or dress up the figures with additional gear-, the new ones had no clothes at all, and all their features were directly molded onto the figures surface. This also allowed Mattel to cut down the cost of production of the action figures. The new figures also lacked of spring, sound or light features, which were not included until 2015, but in limited figures only.

The new reboot series was also notorious for the release of Max's allies for the first time. In the original toy line, only Cytro was produced as Max's crime fighter companion. In the reboot series, additional to Cytro, Forge Ferrus, Ven-Ghan and La Fiera action figures were released. Also another notorious change it was the New Max Steel figures from 2013–2016 were molded and shaped as a 16-year-old boy, notoriously younger and less muscular than the original ones. But figures made after 2016 were retooled to emulate an 18-year-old boy, making this the very first time Max showed some aged in both, toys and series. The later action figures also changed Max's face, making it more similar to the original from 1999.

Comic books

When the first Max Steel toys were released in 1997, Mattel distributed a free 12 page comic book titled Take it to the Max to introduce the character to children. The comic was written by Richard Bruning based on the sourcebook by Andy Hartnell, and penciled by Scott Benefiel with Tom McWeeney and Tommy Yune. Inkers were Jasen Rodriguez, Tom McWeeney and Lucian Rizzo. Until now there are four known language versions of this comic: English, Spanish, Italian and Greek. The English version was distributed mostly in America and United Kingdom, the Spanish version was largely distributed on Latin America and Spain, while the Italian one was obviously distributed in Italy and the Greek one in Greece, especially through the Modern Times superhero comics.

The comic consists mostly of two different briefing presentations which are supposed to happen at the same time in DREAD and N-Tek headquarters respectively, in which each CEO explains Max's abilities, powers and capacities from their opposite points of view. While Jefferson Smith presents Max as a great tool to counter terrorism, John Dread considers Max as a Major threat. In the background, while hearing Jefferson's presentation, Josh remembers the accident which transformed him into Max Steel and adds complementary information about his personal life not mentioned by Jefferson or Dread in the briefings. Laura Chen also makes her first public presentation in the comic.

In the last pages, the comic also contains biographies of all main characters: Max, Jefferson, Dread, Psycho, Rachel and 'Berto.

Most of the facts mentioned in the comic are present and developed in the TV series first season. There are some details which are slightly different though. The comic it is supposed to be based on Mattel's Max Steel Sourcebook and since the creative control of the TV series changed three times due to the bankruptcy of the two initial animation studios, it is possible that few of the hints mentioned in the comic never had a chance to be developed in the series, or maybe they were discarded in favor of further development of the characters.

Among the most notorious differences, it is mentioned that N-Tek's founder and original CEO was Jim McGrath, -Max's father-, instead of Marco Nathanson. John Dread does not wear glasses as he always does in the series, and it is mentioned that 'Berto is a traditional die hard computer nerd with no experience with girls or real life at all, (in the series he does has a life, and he is even a regular skilled fighter). The comic also insinuates the possibility that Psycho is Max's biological father, and they may have a relationship similar as Luke Skywalker and Darth Vader from Star Wars. This plot in particular was never mentioned in the TV series or movies, but the 2004 movie Endangered Species includes a scene in which Psycho defeats Max, and offers him join forces to rule mankind together. This scene is extremely similar as the one represented by Luke and Vader in The Empire Strikes Back.

In 2006 Mattel released a 4 issue series of mini comics, each four pages long. Each comic described an encounter between Max and a specific version of Elementor (Earth, Fire, Water and Air, respectively). The mini comics were used mostly as brochure to introduce Elementor to kids.

In 2013, VIZ Media's all-ages imprint, Perfect Square, released The Parasites, the first in a series of a full length graphic novels featuring a revamped Max Steel universe that tied into the new television series. Edited by former Naruto manga editor, Joel Enos, the first graphic novel was written by The Stuff of Legend co-creator Brian Smith and illustrated by Jan Wijngaard. The next two books in the series, Hero Overload and Haywire were released in 2014 and featured stories by writers B. Clay Moore and Tom Pinchuk, as well as more artwork from Wijngaard and Voltron Force artist, Alfa Robbi.

TV series

Netter Digital Entertainment produced a TV series of the same name, based on a 19-year-old college student named Josh McGrath, who has super powers and can transform into the powerful Max Steel.
The series starts with the episode "Strangers"; Max and his partner Rachel Leeds are at a UN meeting when Rachel and all attendants disappear — except Max, who was on the roof watching, something Rachel scolded him for. Later, Dr. Roberto Martinez finds out that the floor inside rotated, sending everyone in the room into a hidden chamber under the floor, while a new floor spun into place. The enemy is later revealed to be L'Etranger, and he has taken the UN Representatives as hostages and is escaping on a train with them. Max and 'Berto follow Rachel's tracking signal, hidden in her earring, to the train. Max fights L'Etranger on top of the train, but in the middle of the confrontation, his enemy is knocked off the train.

The first episode doesn't give much background on who Max Steel is or what he does, only that he has a double-identity, works for a secret organization, and is super-powered. Until the third episode, "Shadows," it is revealed through a series of flashbacks how Josh became Max Steel: Josh apparently fell asleep outside of N-Tek while visiting his father. He hears someone break down a back door into N-Tek, so he follows the man down an elevator. Both of them are caught by N-Tek security agents, but the intruder, who is revealed to be "Psycho," Max' future enemy, in human disguise, defeats the agents. Josh then follows Psycho into a room where he sees Psycho stealing N-Tek Nanoprobes. Josh and Psycho battle for a moment, and in the middle of the fight, Josh kicks Psycho in the face, revealing his metal skull-like face. Josh panics, and Psycho fires his laser at Josh, but hits the glass holding the nanoprobes instead, causing the container to burst, sending the probes onto Josh's body. Jefferson finds Josh in an extremely weak condition, infected by the probes. 'Berto tells them that the probes are dying, causing Josh to die with them. They both need transphasic energy to survive, so they put Josh inside the transphasic regenerator (a machine capable of regenerating the nanoprobes). This procedure saves Josh's life, but also gives him powers boosted by the probes, now synchronized with his body. Josh confronts Jefferson to let him work at N-Tek but his stepfather refuses. Then Josh tells him that "Josh McGrath is out of the picture", and transforms into Max Steel.

The first season lasted 13 episodes. After that, Netter Digital had gone bankrupt, so Foundation Imaging took over Season 2. For similar reasons, Season 3 was developed by Mainframe Entertainment. The third season also took a different approach: N-Tek's counter-terrorism section is shut down due to the events present in "Breakout," the 2nd-season finale, so the main characters become extreme sports stars. One could state the plot resembled that of the CGI Action Man series (which was Max Steel's main competition at the time of airing). Season 3 would end up being the final season of Max Steel, ending with the episode, "Truth Be Told."

About two years after the series ended, a movie, titled "Endangered Species," was released direct-to-DVD. A Max Steel movie was released every year from 2004 up until 2012. However, the movies took a different approach; while the series focused on chasing terrorists, secret agents, and super-enhanced humans, the movie's plots were focused on fighting superpowered mutants and monsters. The movies also changed the continuity, and Josh McGrath no longer exists.

A re-imagining of the first series, which has the same title, premiered on Disney XD March 25, 2013. In this re-imagining, Josh McGrath no longer exists, and he is known as Maxwell "Max" McGrath. Also, Max Steel is no longer one person, but two; Maxwell and an Ultralink named "Steel." Maxwell (who is a Tachyon-Human Hybrid) has the ability to generate  Tachyon Unlimited Radiant Bio-Optimized, or TURBO energy, however, he cannot contain it, as it causes him to become unstable. However Steel, the Ultralink, has the ability to merge with Maxwell, which helps Maxwell stabilize his turbo energy. After the two combine forces, "Max Steel" is created.

Accolades

Max Steel was nominated at the British Academy Children's Awards in the category "BAFTA Kid's Vote – Television".

Movies

Currently, the movies are only available in Latin America, with an English release unknown. Endangered Species is the only one so far to have been released in the United States. The movies offer a different perspective on N-Tek and the creation of Max Steel. Through this, the world has been retconned. Usually, Max Steel movies are offered as bonus gifts with the purchase of other products, and are not available in other ways. In 2003, in the United States, if you selected Max Steel action figures you would get a free Max Steel: Endangered Species DVD. Countdown was included free in the largest playsets of the toy line in the '06 Christmas and as a free gift by buying a Happy Meal during November in Latin America only. In Mexico, Dark Rival was available inside an ActII Popcorn special promo pack at the end of 2007 and early 2008. Bio Crisis premiered with no advertising at all, except a brief announcement to the press in a particular interview in Mattel's regional headquarters. The movie was immediately available as a bonus gift with the purchase of different products, but only at very specific locations, since at the same time, Dark Rival and Forces of Nature were relaunched, as part of the countdown to Max Steel's Tenth Anniversary Celebration.

Several new characters (not present in the original TV series) were introduced in the movies.

Max Steel: Endangered Species
Released: 2004
Length: 66 minutes
Max Steel is Josh McGrath, an amateur extreme sports athlete, and Special Agent of the N-Tek corporation. By becoming a Max Steel and using his Turbo Mode he is granted greater speed and strength. Among the most advanced animation technology, music and effects, he participates in the Far Challenge the Americas, one sporting event that brings together top extreme athletes of the continent and tests on location in Argentina and Brazil. During the development of the plot, Max Steel takes control and responsibility of its powers and takes a clear leadership position by having to help their friends, who are attacked by a scorpion. Bioconstrictor and Psycho, his two worst enemies have joined forces to defeat him in an adventure that takes them to Peru and Ecuador, to the ruins of the Inca civilization. Meanwhile, Max will partner with a smart jaguar who becomes his best friend and fights with him against the villains.

Max Steel: Forces of Nature
Released: 2005
Length: 52 minutes
Forces of Nature is the only movie whose title was changed in Latin America. It was released under the name "El dominio de los elementos" (Element's Dominion). All other movies kept their respective names, even translated in different languages. In this movie, Jefferson Smith gets back to Bio-Con's abandoned base. There he finds several of Bio-Con's animals in stasis, most of them failed experiments, with one exception: one of them, codenamed Elementor, wakes up and escapes from its container. Elementor looks up for five different Elementium isotopes, which Bio-Con originally used to experiment and mutate him with the intention to create a creature much more ferocious than himself. Each isotope grants Elementor the power to control and mimic one specific element: Earth, Water, Wind, and Fire. Once in possession of these 4 elements, the power to control Metal and Ice is granted as an extra bonus. One by one, Elementor absorbs each isotope and gains new powers. Then Jefferson puts Max under arrest without further explanations, but Max is able to break free when Elementor attacks N-Tek's headquarters looking for the last isotope. Max and Jeff find a way to escape but before they can leave the area, Jefferson reveals to Max that years ago when he was transformed into "Max Steel", in order to save his life the fifth isotope was placed inside his body, and that the arrest was just an effort to hide him from Elementor, since nobody knows for sure what would happen if the isotope is extracted from Max's body. After a brief confrontation with Elementor, Berto and Kat discovers that the fifth Isotope makes the others go haywire instead of adding new powers to its wearer, so Max decides to confront Elementor instead of running away. At the final battle, Max releases the power of the fifth isotope until its overcharge causes a reaction that destroys Elementor.

Max Steel: Countdown
Released: 2006
Length: 51 minutes
After a battle against Psycho's remaining androids, Max discovers that Elementor (after having been destroyed over a year ago) has survived as an unstable power form. Elementor invades N-Tek, takes over Jeff's body, and goes to the Transphasic Generator in an attempt to use it to reconstitute his physical body. 'Berto reverses the power, and accidentally forces Elementor to divide himself into his different versions (meaning, Max has to face 6 different beasts, each one with a different power).  Max is attacked by the Elementor's, and is injured by them. 'Berto uses his updated Nano-probes to save Max' life. However, it is revealed that Kat is infected with Elementium, and is dying. Now, the Elementor's, each with a mind of its own, and controls only its respective element, work as a team and try to take over the planet. However, Max, using the new steel Nano-probes, tricks Elementor by telling him that, if the world is going be controlled by the monsters, he prefers to destroy the Earth instead. All the Elementors attempt to kill Max, but instead fall into his trap. Max, 'Berto, and Kat (poisoned with Elementium) manage to reunite them all in a desert wasteland. 'Berto reconstructs the "Imploder," a blackhole device found in Psycho's base at the beginning of the film, now to only affect Elementium. The process nukes Elementor and strips all the isotopes from his body, leaving him in his original Bio-Con duplicate state. It also takes the Elementium out of Kat's body, saving her.

Max Steel: Dark Rival
Released: 2007
Length: 51 mins
Unknown thefts of N-Tek property have Max Steel on the tail of a new super enemy, Troy Winter, who claims to be superior to Max in every sense. The chase is on when Team Steel realize Troy's goal is to obtain a piece of a comet named Morphosos using the stolen N-Tek technology and deliver it into Warren Hunter's hands. During a battle with Max, Troy falls into a volcano with a piece of the comet. The chemical reaction between the extreme heat and the comet's components transforms Troy into a sharp dark mineral crystal like creature, with the power to "extract" other living being's life force and abilities. Troy then adopts the name of Extroyer and attacks N-Tek headquarters. In the middle of this confrontation, Elementor is once again released. Extremely weak, Elementor chases Extroyer seeking the comet fragments as a new source of power, but he is "extruded" and defeated while Extroyer takes over his ice form (which he used to confront and battle Max at Eclipse Towers) and becomes a glass blue crystal-like frozen elemental called X-Elementor but soon he is beaten by Steel using a gun with Morphosos-seducing Nano-cubes. Troy takes 'Berto, Kat and Jefferson as hostages and forces Max to obey him. Extroyer uses N-Tek's stolen magnets powered by Max to redirect the comet Morphosos near Earth, so he can take as much crystal fragments as he wants, but it's too late when he realizes it was all a setup, and he's sent into deep space instead, stuck into the comet's surface.

Max Steel: Bio Crisis
Released: 2008
Length: 47 minutes
Max has to investigate a contaminated jungle, and travels from outer space to the center of the earth in his quest to unveil this mystery. At the beginning of the story, it is mentioned that the last battle against Extroyer has permanently crippled the Adrenalink system, forcing Max to go back to an updated version of Going Turbo!, (A complete explanation of this new energy system appears in Turbo Missions Episode 12: Relaunch). In this movie, a new enemy, the nefarious Doctor Grigor Rendel makes his first presentation. It is revealed that Iago has been working for him from the beginning, secretly stealing technology from Eclipse. Rendel has constructed an android named Cytro, whose prime directive is to help him in his plans to take control of the contaminated jungle and destroy Max in the process. Accidentally, the programming of Cytro is scrambled and for a couple of hours thinks he must protect Max instead of fighting him. However, he is aware of the malfunction, and constantly mentions how much time is left until he is "authorized" again to kill Max. Thanks to the information retrieved by Iago, Dr. Rendel locates Elementor immediately after the battle in Dark Rival, taking advantage of his unconsciousness, taking him prisoner, to perform new experiments to repower him. In an effort to synthesize Morphosos Crystals, Dr. Rendel uses fragments recovered from Extroyer's body, partially contaminated with Troy Winter's DNA. As a result, it creates an Extroyer clone. Taking his opportunity while Max is busy fighting the Fire Elementor, the clone absorbs the comet fragment into his body and becomes a giant monster. Despite the fact that he is currently in "evil mode", Cytro makes one last supreme effort to stop him and reverts the effect of the crystals, causing an explosion that reduces both to smithereens. Rendel is arrested, as Max finds Cytro's memory core and gets Berto to rebuild him.

Max Steel: The Mutant Menace
Released: 2009
Length: 47 minutes
After being reconstructed, Cytro becomes Max's mission partner, but now both are placed under the direct orders of Forge Ferrous, a new N-Tek field commander, instead of Jefferson. This new boss is a control freak with an aggressive and all-for-the-team attitude which contrasts with Max's free spirit, causing several conflicts. In response to an emergency call, Max and Cytro are sent to a subterranean lab in Antarctica, which is actually a prison for an unstable N-Tek agent who suffers a heavy mutation due to heavy exposure to chemical contamination. After fighting several "toxoids" (little mutant creatures born from chemical waste) and directly disobeying Ferrours's orders, Max gets into the prison level, thinking he can save the injured agent, just to discover it's just a scheme to free him. The agent is then revealed as Titus Octavius Xander, aka Toxzon, a mutant who consumes and manipulates toxic substances, sealed in a Nanotech armor similar to Max's Nano-Suit, but more primitive and bulky. With his vast knowledge of N-Tek fighting techniques and hazardous powers, Toxzon defeats Max and Cytro and escapes, trying to locate and destroy N-Tek headquarters to contaminate the world in retaliation for what he considers a long time in prison and suffering, refusing to accept his incarceration was a desperate effort to save his life since his mutated body is not capable of surviving in a clean environment without the help of his containment armor. To combat Toxzon, Max undergoes a procedure that increases his body's Turbo Fuel capacity and a brand-new nano-suit with ten times more power, allowing him to battle Toxzon on equal footing. During the final battle, it is revealed the same machine which caused Toxzon's mutation is still working, now packing radioactive material as it was initially intended. Toxzon reconfigures the device to make openings in the nano-pyramids so he can absorb it, increasing his powers. During his encounter with Max, he overpowers Max and tries to make him fall into the device, but Max knocks off Toxzon's protective face mask and kicks him into the machine, trapping him in a nano-pyramid, which becomes his new prison.

Max Steel: The Toxic Legion
Released: 2010
Length: 48 minutes
After Toxzon's capture, Max and Cytro are sent to space to detonate and destroy the Morphosos comet once and for all. In the middle of their mission, they find Troy Winters trapped inside the comet. Somehow, the comet radiation has purified the Morphosos crystals within him, curing him of his Extroyer state and reverting him to a normal human being, but still retaining his power to extract the life force of others. His memory has also been wiped, so he has no memory not only of the entire Extroyer episode (as appeared on Dark Rival) but also of any negative feelings against Max Steel, even considering himself a long-time friend of his. On Earth, Max is initially trustful, but Forge distrusts Troy due to his experience with Toxzon and orders him to be on 24-hour watch. In the N-Tek prison, Toxzon realizes he can use some of his toxoids to re-contaminate Troy's body when Troy extracts their life force, allowing him to use his powers to turn him back into Extroyer, now under his control. Toxzon also frees other N-Tek prison inmates to increase the chaos and leaves the place in the company of Elementor. The trio lands in a major US city, where Toxzon convinces Elementor to transform into a giant Air mass, powers him up with a new isotope stolen by Extroyer, and then contaminates him to produce a sizeable poisonous cloud that will spread all over the world, erasing all life on the planet. Max purifies Extroyer with his Turbo Powers, reverting him into Troy, and convinces him to extract the storm's power from Toxzon, weakening him enough for Max to defeat him, while Cytro captures the now-mindless Elementor. Troy goes off on his own, needing to control his powers, and wishes Max farewell. However, a news reporter named Mike Nickelson is mutated by the fallout of the toxic cloud, transforming him into a scrap metal monster.

Max Steel: Makino's Revenge
Released: 2011
Length: 49 minutes
Mike Nickelson, a news reporter who suffered a mutation due to a radioactive contamination caused during a battle between Max Steel and the Toxic Legion comes back with a vengeance. Blaming N-Tek for his current condition, Nickelson, who now calls himself "Makino", tries to capitalize on the fame and notoriety Max has gained as a people's hero to turn public opinion against him. Makino uses his newfound power to control machinery to cause a satellite accident that burns to ashes a ghost town, but "leaks" to the media that N-Tek was responsible for it and releases a digitally altered version of the incident, which causes the group to be in the middle of a legal investigation for its covert operations. During the process, Berto is detained by local authorities. Taking advantage of the situation, Makino kidnaps him and forces him to reveal the secret of N-Tek nanotechnology which allows Max to hyper-compress weapons and spy equipment to add them to hil arsenal, now allowing him to absorb and partially reconstruct himself into vehicles. Since Makino can partially transform himself into a battle machine, Cytro is upgraded with transforming abilities, (similar to those of Transformers) which allows him to change into a giant robot, and later a tank. After Berto's successful rescue, Makino publicly challenges Max to an ultimate fight to determine who's the real protector of the people: in the same stadium Berto was held prisoner, both contenders will have to fight while being watched by the world, and demonstrate their true motivations and reasons to fight for mankind. However, the challenge is a scheme to ruin N-Tek's and Max's reputations. Thanks to his expertise as a media reporter, Nickelson delays and edits the "live broadcast", so the audience sees him as a hero. Cytro leaves Max to fight alone, but teams up with Berto to disrupt the computer's systems and connect the stadium's camera's to the internet and TV satellites around the world so that everybody can learn the truth behind Makino's plot. Max manages to defeat Makino and remove the hard drive and power core within his chest, leaving him powerless. With the defeat and public confession of Makino, N-Tek's name is finally cleared and Makino is sent to prison.

Montrous Alliance

Part 1: Urban Storm
Released: 2012
Length: 12 minutes
Max's mission to retrieve a dangerous device in a violent storm is foiled by a mysterious agent.  Meanwhile, two of his old rivals, Toxzon and Makino are brewing up trouble of their own on a prison transport ship.

Part 2: Toxic Tech Threat
Released: 2012
Length: 12 minutes
Max gets teamed up with Jet Ferrus, an N-Tek cadet with a secret agenda and a history of rebellious behavior, and Forge's daughter.  While Elementor distracts Max with a mid-air attack, Toxzon and Makino start the long journey toward Toxzon's secret lair to work on the next phase of Toxzon's diabolical plan.

Part 3: Diving into the Depths
Released: 2012
Length: 12 minutes
Max, Jet, and Cytro dive deep into the depths to find Toxzon's secret base, encountering trap after trap to chase after the villain. Meanwhile, Toxzon explains his plan to have Makino take over N-Tek's brand-new aerial battle fortress, the Warden.

Part 4: Flame Test
Released: 2012
Length: 12 minutes
To enact his plan, Toxzon uses an archaic Cyclotron to enhance Makino's power to control machines. Meanwhile, Max, Cytro, and Jet chase encounter both Toxzon and Elementor, who try their best to stop them from leaving the lair alive.

Part 5: Toxic Assault
Released: 2012
Length: 12 minutes
With Makino empowered and ready to rock, Toxzon puts his plan into motion to take over the Warden and poison the world. Meanwhile, Max, Cytro, and Jet attempt to board the cruiser and stop Toxzon's plans.

Part 6: The Final Battle
Released: 2012
Length: 12 minutes
After taking down Makino, Max, and Jet face off against Toxzon in a final fight.

2015 Trilogy

The Wrath of Makino (Part One and Part Two)
Released: 2015
Length: 44 minutes

Dawn of Morphos (Part One and Part Two)
Released: 2015
Length: 44 minutes

Maximum Morphos (Part One and Part Two)
Released: 2015
Length: 44 minutes

2016 Animated Films

Team Turbo (Part One and Part Two)
Released: 2016
Length: 44 minutes

Team Turbo Fusion Tek (Part One, Part Two and Part Three)
Released: 2016
Length: 66 minutes

2017 Animated Films

Turbo-Charged (Part One and Part Two)
Released: 2017
Length: 44 minutes

Turbo-Warriors (Part One and Part Two)
Released: 2017
Length: 44 minutes

Live action movie

Paramount Pictures planned to remake Max Steel as motion picture. Originally, Taylor Lautner had been confirmed to star in the lead role as Josh McGrath. However, by March of 2010, Lautner had dropped out of the film in favor of Hasbro and Universal's Stretch Armstrong.
Due to the relaunch of Max Steel in 2013, all plans for a live action movie were suspended. On August 2, 2013, it was revealed that Dolphin Entertainment were working on a Max Steel film. Christopher Yost was announced as writer, whereas Stewart Hendler was confirmed as director. The film follows along the plotline of the reboot and not the original series'. The film was distributed by Open Road Films and was originally planned for released in 2014. On February 6, 2014, the studio had cast Ben Winchell as Max Steel and Ana Villafane as his love interest Sofia Martinez. On April 29, 2014, actor Andy Garcia was cast in the role of Dr. Miles Edwards, a brilliant and mysterious scientist. On May 20, 2014, actor Mike Doyle was cast in a role.  The film was released in the United States by Open Road Films on October 14, 2016, and was a critical and commercial failure.

Video games
Mattel Interactive made a Max Steel video game Max Steel: Covert Missions for the Dreamcast.
Each new Max Steel toy released starting in 2007 and until late 2011 contained a "credit card". Depending on the toy's value, the cards contains a specific amount of credits named "Max Points" that can be used to log in and unlock and play different missions in Max Steel online video game. The online video game can be accessed through the Max Steel official website only. In 2012, as part of Max Steel reboot, the credit cards were eliminated and the access to website is now free of purchases.

Max Steel's alter ego
In the TV show's initial run, Josh McGrath was a white, blond 19-year-old. After the accident in which the N-Tek nanoprobes infected his body, he gained the ability to transform himself into a dark-haired athletic adult, older and stronger than Josh. This grown-up alter ego is Max Steel.

Contrary to most heroes with secret identities, Josh's wasn't an issue except with his personal relations, mostly with his girlfriend and fans from the Extreme Sports Circuit. At different times, both Psycho and Dread witnessed Josh's transformation into Max from a remote location and don't show any surprise about it. In at least one episode, Josh transforms in Psycho's presence. In another episode, Psycho chases Josh, forces him to separate from his friends and obligates him to transform into Max Steel. It is not clear how many of Max's enemies knows about his secret identity. At the end of the first season, it is revealed that one of the most trusted Directors of N-Tek, Jean Mariot, was really a DREAD mole, which explains how their members knew about Max's true identity, but does not explain why Max himself never cares about keeping his identity a secret.
In the Season 2 episode "Old Friend, New Enemy," Max personally reveals to Bio-Con his true identity.

In the third series, due to a combination of factors- the change of the creative design team, a change in the animation company, and the lack of market in the US- all companies involved in the production of Max Steel gradually dropped the secret identity concept, but still had them going on "secret missions", with little-to-no help from N-Tek. The movies, released after the TV show ended, took a different approach: Officially, his Josh identity was dropped and Max does not transform at all. This decision wasn't difficult to take, since all Max Steel merchandising and licensed products, promos and advertising campaigns always portrayed him as a brunette and no licensed products were ever produced with his secret identity. The "Josh" as secret identity concept was present only on the TV show and the first movie, Endangered Species, although Josh is also seen in a flashback scene in "Forces of Nature," when Jeff reflects on when the creation of "Max Steel" took event.

By 2006, "Josh McGrath" was almost forgotten, and all references to him and his personal life were removed from the main story.  Even in normal situations, the character was still referred to as Max. Apparently, Josh was slowly phased out until he was simply eliminated from the story continuity, which was readjusted to eliminate any trace of him. Any mention of Josh was removed from action figure boxes and all other licensed merchandising. The 2005 movie Forces of Nature shows Josh for the final time in a flashback in which the origin of Max Steel is briefly explained for new audiences. The 2008 movie Bio Crisis recreates the very same scene when Psycho infects Max with the N-Tek's nanoprobes, followed with a brief explanation of the process used to save his life. However, this time, it is stated that Max Steel (not Josh) is the victim. The character in scene is Max Steel indeed, with his exact "Max" appearance. In the movies current continuity, Josh simply never existed.

In the 2013 TV series reboot, the main character is renamed Maxwell MacGrath, "Max" (for short) by family and friends. When in "turbo mode" he is known as Max Steel because he combines with an Ultralink named Steel.

Logo color

Over the years, Max Steel's logo has varied, while still keeping the same style, the color has varied.
The logo represented in the TV series featured the words "Max" in orange. It also had smaller letters within the letters, which also read "Max." These were a burnt orange. However, some toys sported different colors; some had the words "Max" in red on the top, and faded to yellow at the bottom; with black words within reading "Max," while others were a more yellow, with less red, and featured the words "Max" within orange. However, some were just similar to the TV series'. However, for the first movie, the color of "Max" was changed to blue, and stayed that way through "Forces of Nature." After the Adrenalink system was introduced, the color of "Max" was changed to green, and featured a lightning bolt through the words (replacing the original "Max" letters within the word "Max"). The green logo was used until 2013, when Mattel decided to reboot the franchise. For the 2013 reboot, the logo was redesigned. Now, the "Max" is silver (as opposed to the yellow/orange of the original), while the "Steel" is a glowing blue (as opposed to silver).

References

External links
 
 Video: Max Steel – 2013 New York Toy Fair
 Jouets Max steel france

 
Action figures
Playscale figures
1990s toys
2000s toys
2010s toys